is a Japanese footballer who plays for J2 League club Tochigi SC, on loan from FC Tokyo. He played for Japan national team.

Club career

Sanfrecce Hiroshima 
Takahagi started his professional career at Sanfrecce Hiroshima, a club he previously played with at youth levels. In 2006, Takahagi played a full season on loan with Ehime FC, before returning to Sanfrecce Hiroshima in 2007.

Western Sydney Wanderers 
On 14 January 2015, Takahagi signed with Western Sydney Wanderers for their 2015 AFC Champions League campaign. He was released by the Wanderers on 6 June 2015.

FC Seoul 
On 16 June 2015, Takahagi joined South Korean side FC Seoul in K League Classic.

Club statistics

1Includes Japanese Super Cup and FIFA Club World Cup.

National team statistics

Honours

Club
Sanfrecce Hiroshima
J1 League: 2012, 2013
J2 League: 2008
Japanese Super Cup: 2008, 2013

FC Seoul
K League 1: 2016
Korean FA Cup: 2015

FC Tokyo
J.League Cup: 2020

Japan
EAFF East Asian Cup: 2013

Individual
 J.League Cup New Hero Award: 2010
 J.League Best XI: 2012
 Korean FA Cup MVP Award: 2015

References

External links

 
 Yojiro Takahagi at the Japan National Football Team
 

1986 births
Living people
Association football people from Fukushima Prefecture
Japanese footballers
Association football midfielders
Japan international footballers
J1 League players
J2 League players
A-League Men players
K League 1 players
Sanfrecce Hiroshima players
Ehime FC players
Western Sydney Wanderers FC players
FC Seoul players
FC Tokyo players
Footballers at the 2006 Asian Games
Japanese expatriate footballers
Japanese expatriate sportspeople in South Korea
Expatriate footballers in South Korea
Japanese expatriate sportspeople in Australia
Expatriate soccer players in Australia
Asian Games competitors for Japan